Complement C1r subcomponent (activated complement C1r, C overbar 1r  esterase, C1r) is a protein involved in the complement system of the innate immune system. In humans, C1r is encoded by the C1R gene.

C1r along with C1q and C1s form the C1 complex, which is the  first component of the serum complement system. C1r is an enzyme that activates C1s to its active form, by proteolytic cleavage.

Clinical significance 
Ehlers-Danlos syndrome Periodontal type is associated with mutations in the CR1 gene

Function 

C1r has been shown to interact with C1s. C1r cleaves C1s to form the active form of C1s.

References

Further reading

External links 
 
 

Complement system
EC 3.4.21